The String Quartet No. 4 (D 46) in C major was composed by Franz Schubert in 1813.

Movements
 Adagio – Allegro con moto (C major)
 Andante con moto (G major)
 Menuetto: Allegro (B-flat major, with Trio in C major)
 Allegro (C major)

Sources
 
 Franz Schubert's Works, Series V: Streichquartette edited by Joseph Hellmesberger and Eusebius Mandyczewski. Breitkopf & Härtel, 1890
 Otto Erich Deutsch (and others). Schubert Thematic Catalogue (several editions), No. 46.
 New Schubert Edition, Series VI, Volume 3: Streichquartette I edited by Martin Chusid. Bärenreiter, 1979.

External links 
 
 

String Quartet No. 04
1813 compositions